The 1956 South Dakota gubernatorial election was held on November 6, 1956.

Incumbent Republican Governor Joe Foss defeated Democratic nominee Ralph Herseth with 54.39% of the vote.

Primary elections
Primary elections were held on June 5, 1956.

Democratic primary

Candidates
Ralph Herseth, former State Senator

Results

Republican primary

Candidates
Joe Foss, incumbent Governor

Results

General election

Candidates
Ralph Herseth, Democratic
Joe Foss, Republican

Results

References

Bibliography
 

1956
South Dakota
Gubernatorial
November 1956 events in the United States